Celaenorrhinus illustroides is a species of butterfly in the family Hesperiidae. It is found in Etoumbi in the Republic of the Congo.

References

Butterflies described in 1971
illustroides